Kadichambadi is a village in the Kumbakonam taluk of Thanjavur district, Tamil Nadu, India.

Demographics 

As per the 2001 census, Kadichambadi had a total population of 1705 with 867 males and 838 females. The sex ratio was 967. The literacy rate was 64. It is located 5 km from Kumbakonam.
The name has been derived from an event. When a king stayed here, he was woke up by a bird's sound, the incident was called as "Kirricham Padi" (Kirricham - a bird, Padi - sings). From that the name slowly changed to Kadichambadi.

The Soundararajan Temple, dedicated to Vishnu, is situated here.

References 

 

Villages in Thanjavur district